The woolly dormouse (Dryomys laniger) is a species of rodent in the family Gliridae endemic to Turkey.

The woolly dormouse's range is restricted to south-west to eastern Anatolia along the Taurus Mountains. It lives in rocky and stony alpine sites. In its south-western range, it is found in rocky areas surrounded by Cedar, Juniper, Cypress, Fir and Oak. It is an omnivore, eating arthropods such as beetles and grasshoppers as well as some vegetable matter.

References

2006 IUCN Red List of Threatened Species.
Holden, M. E. 2005, Family Gliridae. D. E. Wilson and D. M. Reeder (eds.), Mammal Species of the World a Taxonomic and Geographic Reference. Johns Hopkins University Press, Baltimore, pp. 819–841.

Dryomys
Fauna of Turkey
Mammals described in 1968
Endemic fauna of Turkey
Taxonomy articles created by Polbot